"We Weren't Born to Follow" is the first single released in August 2009 from Bon Jovi's eleventh studio album, The Circle. The single premiered on radio on August 17, 2009. The single was nominated for a Grammy Award for Best Pop Performance by a Duo or Group with Vocals.

Since then, the song has reached the peak position on the Billboard Hot 100 at number 68.

Music video
The music video, directed by Craig Barry and edited by Brett Langefels for the song was released on October 14, 2009. It features the band performing on the roof of the Clinton Recording Studios in New York City with skyscrapers visible behind them. Interspersed with these scenes are archive clips and pictures of important events and people in history. Designed and composited by Matthew Lucas-Valci, these scenes echo the themes of the song.
The video includes images of:
Bringing down the Berlin Wall in 1989
Lance Armstrong winning the Tour de France
The Dalai Lama
A collection of the Wright brothers plane, a space shuttle and Spaceship One of Virgin Galactic
Virgin Records owner Richard Branson
The Great Wall of China
The protests at Beijing's Tiananmen Square in 1989 and the famous Tank Man picture
Images of US President Barack Obama
Princess Diana in Africa
Patrick Thibodeau, a renowned basketball player of Cumberland, Maine, who has Down's Syndrome, playing on the Greely High School boys' basketball team.
Martin Luther King Jr. delivering his August 1963 "I Have a Dream" speech
Protests about climate change
The late guitarist Les Paul
The successful emergency water landing of US Airways Flight 1549 and pilot Chesley Burnett Sullenberger III
Scenes of the separation stage of a Saturn V rocket along with various astronauts in EVA
Gloria Steinem and feminist demonstrations.
Robert F. Kennedy
Archbishop Desmond Tutu
2009–2010 Iranian election protests

For the week ending November 21, the music video for "We Weren't Born to Follow" reached number 1 on the VH1 Top 20 in the USA.

In popular culture 
In 2009 TBS used the song in its commercials for that year's Major League Baseball playoffs. Jon Bon Jovi gave a copy of the song to his friend Bill Belichick, head coach of the New England Patriots, before its public release. The Patriots had initially planned to play it after touchdowns at Gillette Stadium, but ultimately chose to use "This Is Our House" instead.

Track listing

Personnel
Bon Jovi 
 Jon Bon Jovi - lead vocals
 Richie Sambora - guitars, backing vocals
 Hugh McDonald - bass guitar, backing vocals
 Tico Torres - drums, percussion
 David Bryan - keyboards, backing vocals

Additional musicians
 Charlie Judge - additional keyboards and strings 

Technical personnel
 John Shanks – producer
 Jon Bon Jovi - co-producer
 Richie Sambora - co-producer
 Jeff Rothschild - engineer
 Mike Rew - additional engineer
 Obie O'Brien - additional engineer
 Alex Gibson - additional engineer
 Lars Fox - Pro Tools editor
 Bob Clearmountain - mixing engineer
 Brandon Duncan - mixing assistant
 George Marino - mastering

Charts

Weekly charts

Year-end charts

Release history

References

External links
"We Weren't Born to Follow" on the Official Bon Jovi website 
http://www.oricon.co.jp/music/release/d/837479/1/

Bon Jovi songs
2009 singles
Songs written by Richie Sambora
Songs written by Jon Bon Jovi
2009 songs
Song recordings produced by John Shanks
Island Records singles
American hard rock songs
Post-grunge songs